The year 2009 is the 9th year in the history of World Extreme Cagefighting, a mixed martial arts promotion based in the United States. In 2009 WEC held 8 events beginning with, WEC 38: Varner vs. Cerrone.

Title fights

Events list

WEC 38: Varner vs. Cerrone

WEC 38: Varner vs. Cerrone was an event held on January 25, 2009 at the San Diego Sports Arena in San Diego, California.

Results

WEC 39: Brown vs. Garcia

WEC 39: Brown vs. Garcia was an event held on March 1, 2009 at the American Bank Center in Corpus Christi, Texas.

Results

WEC 40: Torres vs. Mizugaki

WEC 40: Torres vs. Mizugaki was an event held on April 5, 2009 at the UIC Pavilion in Chicago, Illinois.

Results

WEC 41: Brown vs. Faber II

WEC 41: Brown vs. Faber II was an event held on June 7, 2009 at the ARCO Arena in Sacramento, California.

Results

WEC 42: Torres vs. Bowles

WEC 42: Torres vs. Bowles was an event held on August 9, 2009 at the Hard Rock Hotel and Casino in Las Vegas, Nevada.

Results

WEC 43: Cerrone vs. Henderson

WEC 43: Cerrone vs. Henderson was an event held on October 10, 2009 at the AT&T Center in San Antonio, Texas.

Results

WEC 44: Brown vs. Aldo

WEC 44: Brown vs. Aldo was an event held on November 18, 2009 at the Pearl at The Palms in Las Vegas, Nevada.

Results

WEC 45: Cerrone vs. Ratcliff

WEC 45: Cerrone vs. Ratcliff was an event held on December 19, 2009 at the Pearl at The Palms in Las Vegas, Nevada.

Results

See also 
 World Extreme Cagefighting
 List of World Extreme Cagefighting champions
 List of WEC events

References

World Extreme Cagefighting events
2009 in mixed martial arts